The Serb Democratic Party (SDS) was a minor political party established in Serbia in 2011 and mostly active in the province of Vojvodina. The party won a single seat in the Assembly of Vojvodina in the 2016 provincial election, on the list of the Serbian Progressive Party. It subsequently became inactive and may have been disestablished entirely.

History and ideology
According to the party's historical website, the SDS was founded in late August 2011 after a founding meeting in Novi Sad. It associated itself with the legacy of SDS in Croatia and the SDS in Bosnia and Herzegovina, and its stated purpose was to seek unity among the Serbian people and to end what it described as the dissolution of Serbia. At the time of its founding, the SDS called for the organization and co-ordination of organizations representing Serb refugees from Croatia, Bosnia and Herzegovina, and Kosovo and Metohija.

Dragan Dašić was selected as the party's president at a meeting in Subotica in February 2012, and the SDS subsequently fielded its own electoral list in the 2012 Vojvodina provincial election. It received less than one per cent of the popular vote, well below the threshold for representation in the assembly.

After a period of limited activity, the SDS re-constituted its executive at a February 2016 meeting in Novi Sad. Entrepreneur Branislav Švonja was selected as its leader, with Zoran Subotić as the party's organizer for Vojvodina and Radivoj Prodanović as the president of its city board in Novi Sad. On becoming party leader, Švonja sought to situate the party in the legacy of Jovan Rašković's initial leadership of the SDS in Croatia (before the party was taken over by hardline elements) and noted that it was planning to contest the upcoming 2016 provincial election and the concurrent 2016 local elections as part of the coalition around the Serbian Progressive Party. Subotić was ultimately included on the Progressive Party's list for the provincial assembly and was elected when the list won a majority victory.

The SDS seems to have been dormant after this time, and it may have been disestablished entirely. Subotić became the Vojvodina president of a group called the Community of Serbs during his four-year term in the provincial assembly. In the 2020 local elections, he was elected to the Novi Sad city assembly as a member of Aleksandar Šapić's Serbian Patriotic Alliance. 

Švonja was arrested in 2017 due to the activities of a company he had founded. Media coverage of his arrest drew attention to the fact that he had been convicted of vote-buying for the SDS in an off-year municipal election in Odžaci in 2013. One media report from this period described him as having been "involved in politics through various semi-phantom parties and movements" in both Serbia and Croatia over a period of several years. He subsequently became the leader of the Association of Serbs from Bosnia and Herzegovina and Croatia.

References

2011 establishments in Serbia
Monarchist parties in Serbia
Political parties established in 2011
Serb nationalist parties